MacBrien is an Irish surname. Notable people with the surname include:

Sir James Howden MacBrien, Canadian general
Mount Sir James MacBrien, a mountain peak named after Sir James MacBrien
W. A. H. MacBrien, Canadian hockey executive
William Ross MacBrien, Canadian air marshal

See also
McBrien

References